The Murgon Advertiser was a newspaper published in Murgon, Queensland, Australia.

History 
In November 1947, Brian Keighley Gerardy (also known as Brian Keighley-Gerardy) purchased the printing plant of the Northern Boomerang in Mossman to relocate to Murgon to establish the Murgon Advertiser.

The newspaper was published from 1947 to 1949.

See also 
 List of newspapers in Australia

References 

Defunct newspapers published in Queensland